Schweda is a surname. Notable people with the surname include:

Brian Schweda (born 1943), American football player
 (1919–2011), Austrian politician
Raphael Schweda (born 1976), German cyclist

See also
Schweder